The Demitrie River is a river in Dominica.

See also
List of rivers of Dominica

References

Rivers of Dominica